The Royal Canadian Air Force (RCAF) maintains specialised aircraft to transport Canada's monarch and/or other members of the royal family (at which time the aircraft is designated as the Royal Flight), the governor general, prime minister, other senior members of the Government of Canada, and other dignitaries. A small fleet of dedicated executive government transport aircraft are organised into two RCAF squadrons. Other RCAF combat and transport helicopters and fixed-wing aircraft, chartered civilian aircraft, and occasionally scheduled commercial flights may also be used to meet Canada's VIP air transport requirements.

History
Members of the royal family have been flying in the United Kingdom since two Westland Wapitis were delivered to the Royal Air Force's No. 24 Squadron at RAF Northolt in April 1928. Between the following year and 1935, Prince Edward, Prince of Wales, himself purchased 13 aircraft; he became the first member of the royal family to be a pilot and, when he acceded to the throne in 1936 as King Edward VIII, the King's Flight was formed as the world's first head of state aircraft unit.

Executive air transport in Canada can be traced to the formation of the Royal Canadian Air Force (RCAF) in the 1920s; the only Very Important Person (VIP) death in the history of the RCAF was Minister of National Defence Norman McLeod Rogers on 10 June 1940, near Newtonville, Ontario. The RCAF maintained aircraft such as the Lockheed Lodestar, Canadair North Star, Canadair CL-66, and Canadair CL-44-6 until, following the 1968 unification of the country's three armed forces branches into the Canadian Forces, long range VIP transport was carried out using a modified Boeing 707 designated as the CC-137 Husky and short range VIP transport used various combat fixed and rotary wing aircraft. Dedicated VIP transport aircraft did not enter the Canadian Forces until the early 1980s, when 12 CL-600S Challenger business jets were purchased by the Governor General-in-Council from Canadair, which were thereafter given the designations CC-144, CE-144, and CX-144, and painted in the contemporary red and white livery of the Canadian Forces. These jets flew with 414 "Black Knight" Squadron at CFB North Bay until July 1992, and with 434 "Blue Nose" Squadron at CFB Greenwood until May 2000, when eight aircraft were either sold or retired, the remaining two being transferred to 412 Transport Squadron for dedicated executive transport, where the livery was changed to a dark Air Force blue.

At times, the use of executive air transport has been a contentious issue. In 2002, the Governor General-in-Council, on the advice of Prime Minister Jean Chrétien, purchased two additional Challenger jets for exclusive royal, viceregal, and ministerial transport. Use of these planes by ministers of the Crown came under heavy criticism, partly due to the high cost of operation—approximately CAD$11,000 per hour—as well as questions over prioritisation of other military aircraft procurement. Government ministers have typically explained that the use of the Challenger jets is necessary, due to time constraints and/or security issues. Also, Governor General Adrienne Clarkson had used a chartered aircraft to fly from Ottawa to her cottage in Muskoka, Ontario, and it was later revealed that Governor General Michaëlle Jean was flown to The Bahamas on a Canadian Forces Challenger. Both times, the press reports of these actions brought criticism towards the vicereines from some corners; however, the governor general's mode of transport is directed by the Royal Canadian Mounted Police.

Present arrangements

All dedicated VIP transport aircraft in the Canadian Forces are operated by 437 Transport Squadron and 412 Transport Squadron. Attendants on flights operated by these squadrons are select volunteers from various services in the Canadian Forces and serve in their posting for two or three years; they must undergo an intensive training period and additional security background checks prior to VIP transport duty.

The 437 Transport Squadron, based at CFB Trenton, operates five Airbus A310-300s, all designated as CC-150 Polaris; four are configured as normal airliners with cargo transport and aerial refuelling capability, while one, No. 001, is operated in a VIP configuration. This latter aircraft, known officially as Can Force One, has a galley, spartan bedroom (wall panels added to provide privacy with small bed and sofa), sitting room, office space, and a shower approximately the size of a small phone booth. The executive suite includes a satellite telephone, two computer work stations, and a small refrigerator and, at the rear portion of the aircraft, is a normal passenger cabin, used to carry regular military passengers, members of the VIP party, or reporters. The squadron's information officer stated of the interior in 1997: "It's no more luxurious than a good motor home." The aircraft is referred to as the Royal Flight when carrying the King or another member of the royal family. When taxiing, the royal standard of the most senior royal individual on board will be flown from the port-side cockpit window.

412 Transport Squadron, based at Macdonald–Cartier International Airport (formerly CFB Ottawa, and previously at CFB Uplands), is the only RCAF unit dedicated exclusively to executive transport and currently operates Canada's four CC-144-designated Bombardier Challenger 604 and Bombardier Challenger 650 business jets in a VIP configuration.

See also
 Royal and viceroyal transport in Canada
 Air transports of heads of state and government
 The Canadian Crown and the Canadian Forces
 Royal tours of Canada
 Royal Australian Air Force VIP aircraft
 Air transport of the Royal Family and government of the United Kingdom

References

Royal Canadian Air Force
Monarchy in Canada
Canada
Vehicles of Canada
Royal vehicles